, was a journalist, a 9 term member of the House of Representatives of Japan, and the Parliamentary Vice-Minister for Colonial Affairs in the Yonai Cabinet.

Biography
Matsuoka was born the eldest son of Ihei Murakawa, a poor farmer in Tateoka-cho, Kitamurayama-gun, Yamagata Prefecture (now Murayama City). As boy, he worked as an apprentice to his mother's family, sake brewers in the Tochigi Prefecture. At the age of 16, he was adopted by his uncle, Shirao Matsuoka, a Buddhist priest.

Matsuoka would attend Shinshū University and Nihon Law School in Tokyo, then serve in the Japanese Army during the Russo-Japanese War, earning a silver Golden Kite for his valor.

Following the war, he joined the Miyako Shimbun newspaper, where he served as a political reporter, editor, and eventually becoming its vice president. He ran as Yamagata's Seiyūkai representative to the lower house in the 1920 Japanese general election, holding the seat for 7 terms before joining Mitsumasa Yonai's cabinet in 1940.

During his tenure, he was a strong advocate for his rural snowbound constituents who suffered from the harsh winter climate of the region, causing poor harvests and significant property damage every year. Matsuoka's efforts established funds for the national "Snow Region Rural Economic Research Institute" (積雪地方農村経済調査所) and the "Economic Rehabilitation Agency for Agricultural, Forestry and Fishery Areas in Snow Damaged Areas" (雪害地農山漁家経済更正機関), helping improve the lives of many depressed rural villages throughout the Tohoku and the Hokuriku regions.

After World War 2, Matsuoka was expelled from public office as part of the purge of government officials by the Allied forces, during which time he returned to Yamagata to help his constituents in rural areas, serving as the chairman of a Buddhist agricultural cooperative association.

Once the expulsion order was abolished after the Allied occupation ended in 1952, Matsuoka returned to the House of Representatives for 2 more terms with the forerunner to today's Liberal Democratic Party, collapsing while campaigning in Tsuruoka, Yamagata on 13 February 1955. He would die 3 days later at the age of 74 years.

He is remembered today throughout Yamagata for his long service to the region. A bronze statue of him was erected in Shinjo City in 1957. The Chichibōonji Buddhist temple on the grounds of Hongakuji cemetery in Murayama City was built by Matsuoka in 1935, containing a 300 year old Buddha inherited from his adoptive priest father, whom he prayed to for safety during a constituent tour in 1930 when he was caught in a blizzard. It is affectionately known as the "Snow Buddha" (雪の観音) shrine as a result. Murayama City also dedicates a large straw sandal (waraji) to Senso-ji and Komatsuzawa Buddhist temples every 10 years, a practice first started by Matsuoka in 1941.

References

Japanese politicians
Japanese journalists